Thomas Brent Cheseldine (1922 – June 4, 2011), better known as Tommy Brent, was an American theater producer who was known for preserving and managing the historic Theatre-By-the-Sea at Card Ponds Road in South Kingstown, Rhode Island. Brent was born in 1922 in Washington, D.C. and died at Matunuck, Rhode Island in 2011.

References

1922 births
2011 deaths
American theatre managers and producers
People from Washington, D.C.